Marco Küntzel (born 22 January 1976 in Ludwigslust) is a German former professional footballer who played as a forward.

International career
He represented Germany at the 1995 FIFA World Youth Championship.

References

External links
 

1976 births
Living people
Association football forwards
German footballers
Germany youth international footballers
Bundesliga players
2. Bundesliga players
FC Hansa Rostock players
1. FC Union Berlin players
SV Babelsberg 03 players
Borussia Mönchengladbach players
Arminia Bielefeld players
FC Energie Cottbus players
FC Augsburg players
TSG Thannhausen players
FC Pipinsried players
BC Aichach players
People from Ludwigslust
Footballers from Mecklenburg-Western Pomerania